Omarov (feminine: Omarova) is a surname. Notable people with the surname include:

 Ali Omarov (born 1947), lawyer
 Anna Omarova (born 1981), Russian shot putter
 Artur Omarov (born 1988), Czech athlete
  (born 1962), Russian politician
 Gulshat Omarova (born 1968), Kazakh film director
 Hamida Omarova (born 1957), Azerbaijani actress
 Kurban Omarov (born 1980), Russian blogger
 Magomed Omarov (disambiguation), multiple people
Saule Omarova, Kazakh-American attorney, academic, and public policy advisor
 Seitzhan Omarov (1907–1985), Kazakh writer
 Shamil Omarov (1936-2020), Russian pharmacologist